The 1973–74 Copa del Generalísimo was the 72nd staging of the Spanish Cup. The competition began on 26 September 1973 and concluded on 28 June 1974 with the final.

First round

|}
Bye: CD Guecho, CF Calella, UD Mahón and CD Ensidesa.

Second round

|}

Third round

|}

Fourth round

|}
Bye: CD Sabadell CF and Sporting de Gijón.

Fifth round

|}

Round of 16

|}

Quarter-finals

|}

Semi-finals

|}

Final

|}

References

External links
 rsssf.com
 linguasport.com

1974
Copa del Rey
Copa